= Upper Zion, Virginia =

Unincorporated community in Virginia, US

Upper Zion
- Unincorporated community
- Location in Virginia
- Coordinates: 38°03′55″N 77°14′35″W
- Country: United States
- State: Virginia
- County: Caroline
- Elevation: 223 ft (68 m)
- USGS Feature ID: 1477834

Upper Zion is an unincorporated community in Caroline County, Virginia, United States.
